Kai Paulsen (1947 - 28 May 2002) was a Norwegian journalist, photographer, and computer collector.

In 2000 he founded "IT Insider", a technology periodical.

His collection has been donated to the Norwegian Computer History Society by his relatives.

1947 births
2002 deaths
Norwegian photographers
20th-century Norwegian journalists